Warouw is an Indonesian surname of Minahasan origin. Notable people with the surname include:

Anna Warouw (1898–1979), Second Indonesian woman to become a physician
Joop Warouw (1917–1960), Indonesian military officer 
Kezia Warouw (born 1991), Indonesian model
Semuel Jusof Warouw (1900-1983), Indonesian ophthalmologist and politician

Indonesian-language surnames